The Model 1968 recoilless gun is a 105-mm antitank weapon developed and employed by Argentina. The weapon has been in active service since 1968 and 150 were still operational with Argentine forces as of 2000. A similar weapon is the Argentine 105-mm Model 1974 FMK-1 recoilless gun.

Description 
The Model 1968 is mounted on a towing carriage with wheels for transport and can be fired either with its wheels on or dismounted onto a tripod. Aiming is primarily done with the optical sight, but the weapon also includes a FAP (fusil automatico pesado, heavy automatic rifle) spotting rifle. Ammunition for the Model 1968 includes both an 11-kilogram high-explosive and a 15-kilogram high-explosive anti-tank (HEAT) round. The Model 1974 fires a 16.6-kilogram HE round with a muzzle velocity of 400 meters/second and a 14.7-kilogram HEAT round at 514 meters/second.

The maximum range of the piece is 9,200 meters. Direct fire is limited to 1,800 meters using the optical sight with stadiametric rangefinder or 1,200 meters using the spotting rifle. The Model 1974's range characteristics are the same. The Model 1968 is credited with a 200 mm penetration of armor with its HEAT round. The HEAT round for the Model 1974 can penetrate 400 mm of armor.

Like many recoilless weapons, there is a significant back-blast from the Model 1968 with a 40-meter danger zone to the rear of the weapon.

Combat history 
In the late 1960s or early 1970s, the Argentine military attempted to use it as a self-propelled gun or tank destroyer. At least two prototypes (one being either an IHC M5 or M9 half-track and the other a Bren carrier) were fitted with a six-cannon mount each, similar to that of the US-made M50 Ontos. Between 1977 and 1978, on the eve of Operation Soberanía, many carriers and half-tracks were converted to self-propelled guns by having a single Model 1968 mounted on them.

The Model 1968 was fielded by the Argentine Army during the Falklands War. The Model 1974 is in service with Argentina and Guatemala.

Operators

Current 

: 64 M-1974 guns acquired in 1982 or 1983.

Former 
: 72 M-1974 guns acquired in 1981.
: 156 Model 1968 guns acquired in 1971.
: 1 Model 1968 donated by Argentina to the National Navy of Uruguay in 1983.

References

Bibliography 
 (JIW) Hogg, Ian. Jane's Infantry Weapons 1984-85, London: Jane's Publishing Company Ltd., 1984.
 (JIW 2008) Jones, Richard, and Ness, Leland. Jane's Infantry Weapons 2007-2008, Coulsdon: Jane's Information Group Ltd., 2007.
 (JWA) Keymer, Eleanor. Jane's World Armies Issue Twenty-three, Coulsdon: Jane's Information Group Ltd., 2000.
 (ATW) Norris, John. Anti-tank Weapons, London: Brassey's, 1996.

External links

 Photo of the Model 1968 in the Falklands

Artillery of Argentina
Recoilless rifles
Anti-tank weapons
Fabricaciones Militares